John Heijning  ( – ) was a Dutch footballer. He was part of the Netherlands national football team, playing 8 matches between 1907 and 1912. He played his first match on 1 April 1907. He was also part of the Dutch squad for the football tournament at the 1908 Summer Olympics, but he did not play in any matches.

See also
 List of Dutch international footballers

References

1884 births
1947 deaths
Dutch footballers
Footballers at the 1908 Summer Olympics
Netherlands international footballers
Olympic footballers of the Netherlands
People from Bogor
Knights of the Order of the Netherlands Lion
Association football defenders